Lindell Holmes (born April 4, 1957 in Toledo, Ohio) is a retired American boxer who in 1990-91 held the IBF super-middleweight title.

Professional career

Holmes turned professional in 1979 and in 1986 challenged IBF super-middleweight title holder Chong-Pal Park of South Korea. The bout was ruled a no-contest in the 2nd round after an accidental head-clash opened a cut on Park. In a rematch the following year, Holmes lost a split decision.

In 1990 he challenged for the vacant IBF super-middleweight title against Frank Tate, winning a decision and the belt. He defended the belt three times before losing it to Darrin Van Horn by TKO in eleven rounds. In 1993, Holmes challenged WBO super-middleweight title holder Chris Eubank, but lost a decision. He retired later that year.

Professional boxing record

See also
List of super-middleweight boxing champions

References

External links

1957 births
Living people
Middleweight boxers
Super-middleweight boxers
World super-middleweight boxing champions
International Boxing Federation champions
Boxers from Detroit
American male boxers